Gecekondu (Turkish for put up overnight, plural gecekondular) is a Turkish word meaning a house put up quickly without proper permissions, a squatter's house, and by extension, a shanty or shack. Gecekondu bölgesi is a neighborhood made of those gecekondular. Gecekondu neighborhoods offer an affordable alternative for shelter for many low-income households who can not afford to purchase or rent formal housing.

Etymology
 
In Turkish, gece means "night" and kondu means "placed" (from the verb konmak, "to settle" or "to be placed"); thus the term gecekondu comes to mean "placed (built) overnight". And bölge means a "zone", "district" or even "region", so a gecekondu bölgesi is a "suddenly built-up shanty-neighborhood."

Usage

In common usage, it refers to the low cost apartment buildings or houses that were constructed in a very short time by people migrating from rural areas to the outskirts of the large cities. Robert Neuwirth writes in his book Shadow Cities that these squatters are exploiting a legal loophole which states that if one starts building after dusk and moves into a completed house before dawn the next day without having been noticed by the authorities, then the next day the authorities are not permitted to tear the building down but instead must begin a legal proceeding in court (and thus it is more likely one can stay). Such buildings may be constructed without going through the necessary procedures required for construction, such as acquiring building permits, and can be very densely populated. Neuwirth stated in 2004 that "half the residents of Istanbul - perhaps six million people - dwell in gecekondu homes". Despite connotations of urban poverty and overcrowding, almost all gecekondu neighbourhoods are supplied with running water and electricity.

The gecekondu phenomenon is directly linked with the problems of unemployment and poverty in the rural areas of Turkey, especially in the east of the country. In many instances entire villages have migrated to the outskirts of the large industrialized cities in order to seek a better standard of living.

At present, some gecekondu areas are being gradually demolished and replaced by modern mass-housing compounds developed by the government's Mass Housing Development Administration (TOKİ). Gecekondular are present both in small Turkish towns and in large cities such as Izmir, Ankara and Istanbul.

See also
 Slum
 Shanty town
 Favela
 Tower and Stockade
 Township (South Africa)
 Tŷ unnos

References

External links 

 The European Journal of Turkish Studies, Thematic Issue N°1 Gecekondu

Shanty towns in Western Asia
Housing in Turkey
Turkish words and phrases
Squatting in Turkey